Kemijärvi is a lake in the town of Kemijärvi, northern Finland.

References

Landforms of Lapland (Finland)
Kemijärvi